Cavalcade of Song is a 1953 Italian musical film directed by Domenico Paolella and starring Alberto Sordi, Silvana Pampanini and Antonella Lualdi.

It was shot in Ferraniacolor at the Cinecittà studios in Rome.

Cast
 Alberto Sordi as Alberto
 Silvana Pampanini as La dattilografa
 Antonella Lualdi as La dirimpettaia del quinto piano
 Franco Interlenghi as Il notaio
 Marina Vlady as La fanciulla amata
 Flora Mariel
 Erno Crisa as Il guappo
 Galeazzo Benti as Il soldatino
 Enrico Viarisio
 Franco Coop
 Renato Malavasi
 Cosetta Greco as Ex-amante del guappo
 Cristina Fantoni
 Patrizia Lari
 Rosy Mazzacurati
 Delia Scala as Titina
 Aroldo Tieri as L'innamorato della dattilografa
 Luisella Boni
 Nino Manfredi
 Lilli Scaringi
 Mariolina Bovo
 Renata Campanati
 Giulio Chiandotto
 Anna Di Lorenzo
 Fiorella Ferrero
 Cristina Grado
 Lily Granado
 Vittorio Mangano
 Marcella Mariani
 Anna Maria Mazzarini
 Sandro Pistolini as Bambino
 Teresa Pollio
 Marisa Valenti

References

Bibliography

External links

1953 films
1953 musical films
Italian musical films
1950s Italian-language films
Films directed by Domenico Paolella
Films shot at Cinecittà Studios
Minerva Film films
1950s Italian films